CUSU can refer to:

Cambridge University Students' Union
Cardiff University Students' Union
Coventry University Students' Union